is a Japanese baseball player. He previously played pitcher for the Chunichi Dragons on a developmental contract in the Western League.

He was the 1st pick for the Dragons in the 2015 Development Draft.

On the 28 May 2016, it was announced that Nakagawa had been released by the Dragons.

References

External links
 Dragons.jp
 NPB.jp

1993 births
Living people
Baseball people from Mie Prefecture
Japanese baseball players
Nippon Professional Baseball pitchers
Chunichi Dragons players